Deshane Beckford (born 14 April 1998) is a Jamaican footballer who currently plays for Colorado Springs Switchbacks in the USL Championship.

Career

Club
In 2015, Beckford went on trial at West Ham in England. In 2019, Beckford joined Rio Grande Valley in the USL Championship. In April 2021, Beckford joined Colorado Springs Switchbacks FC on loan ahead of the 2021 season.

In 2022, Beckford signed with San Antonio FC For the 2023 season, Beckford returned to Colorado Springs Switchbacks.

International
Beckford has represented Jamaica at the u17 and u23 levels. He made his senior international debut on 20 January 2022 versus Peru.

References

External links
 

Living people
1998 births
Jamaican footballers
Jamaican expatriate footballers
Expatriate soccer players in the United States
Association football forwards
Montego Bay United F.C. players
Harbour View F.C. players
Rio Grande Valley FC Toros players
Colorado Springs Switchbacks FC players
San Antonio FC players
USL Championship players